Casey Rae (born May 23, 1974) is a music business executive, musician and cultural critic, as well as a technology, music industry and media professor. Rae's commentary on the impact of technology on creators can be found in various media, including NPR, The Washington Post, The New York Times, Politico, Billboard, Los Angeles Times, Gizmodo, The Hill, Ars Technica, Sirius XM Radio and other outlets. Rae currently serves as Director, Music Licensing for SiriusXM, the North American satellite radio service. He previously held the post of Chief Executive Officer for the Future of Music Coalition, a national nonprofit education, research and advocacy organization for musicians. He is an adjunct professor in Georgetown University's Communications Culture and Technology graduate program,  and faculty and course author at Berklee College of Music. Rae has written several scholarly articles on matters relating to intellectual property and new digital business models, and has testified before Congress on copyright. He has maintained a website, The Contrarian Media, since 2006, which publishes articles on issues ranging from the economics of cultural production  to the surveillance state to esoterica. Rae is also the owner-operator of Lux Eterna Records, a Washington, DC-based record label specializing in art-rock, experimental pop and avant-garde music. Over the years, Rae has contributed music criticism to Dusted Magazine, Pitchfork and Signal to Noise. His first book, The Priest They Called Him: William S. Burroughs & The Cult of Rock 'n' Roll was published by University of Texas Press in 2019 and has been translated into several languages. A second nonfiction work, Dead Dharma: The Grateful Dead and the American Pursuit of Enlightenment will be published by Oxford University Press.

Biography 
Rae was born in the Northeast US and played in various bands in the 1990s, and worked at a small record shop, before taking a post as the Music Editor for Seven Days Newspaper in Burlington, Vermont. He subsequently relocated to Washington, DC area, where he currently publishes and teaches.

References 

Living people
1974 births
Place of birth missing (living people)
Georgetown University faculty
American male musicians
American technology writers
American nonprofit executives
American music critics